During the Spanish–American War of 1898, Cámara's Flying Relief Column was a  naval task force of Spain's most powerful warships, under the command of Rear Admiral Manuel de la Cámara, tasked with relieving Spanish forces in Manila after the defeat of Spanish Pacific Squadron under Admiral Patricio Montojo y Pasarón by the American Asiatic Squadron under Commodore George Dewey in the Battle of Manila Bay on May 1, 1898. The Spanish fleet, consisting of the battleship Pelayo, armored cruiser Emperador Carlos V, auxiliary cruisers Patriota and Rapido, destroyers Audaz, Osado, and Prosepina, and transports Buenos Aires and Panay, left Spain in June 1898. The squadron was far more powerful than that commanded by Dewey, which only consisted of four protected cruisers and two gunboats. The monitor  had been ordered from the U.S. to the Philippines, and departed on 11 June.

With the bulk of the Spanish Navy heading to the Pacific, the U.S. made plans for battleships Iowa and Oregon and the cruiser USS Brooklyn to raid and bombard Spanish ports. But, following the destruction of the Spanish fleet in the Battle of Santiago de Cuba, Cámara's column was ordered to return to Spain to defend the Spanish coast. On 7 July, after arriving in Egypt, Cámara's fleet turned home, and the American battleships never left the Caribbean.

References

Further reading

External links
The Spanish–American War Centennial Website

Military units and formations of the Spanish–American War
Military units and formations of Spain